Yoshiko Kira (born 14 November 1972) is a Japanese sports shooter. She competed in the women's double trap event at the 1996 Summer Olympics.

References

1972 births
Living people
Japanese female sport shooters
Olympic shooters of Japan
Shooters at the 1996 Summer Olympics
Place of birth missing (living people)
Asian Games bronze medalists for Japan
Asian Games medalists in shooting
Shooters at the 1994 Asian Games
Shooters at the 1998 Asian Games
Medalists at the 1998 Asian Games
20th-century Japanese women